Minuscule 465 (in the Gregory-Aland numbering), α 166 (in the Soden numbering), is a Greek minuscule manuscript of the New Testament, on parchment. Palaeographically it has been assigned to the 11th century. The manuscript has complex contents. 
Formerly it was labeled by 114a and 134p. 
It has liturgical books.

Description 

The codex contains the text of the Acts of the Apostles, Catholic epistles, and Pauline epistles on 231 parchment leaves. The text is written in two columns per page, 24 lines per page.

The order of books: Acts of the Apostles, Catholic epistles, and Pauline epistles. It contains some portions of Septuagint (Book of Wisdom, Song of Songs, and Book of Proverbs 1:1-28:8) and prayers for the service of the Greek Church. According to Scrivener it is a valuable manuscript.

Text 

The Greek text of the codex is a representative of the Byzantine text-type. Aland placed it in Category V.
According to Gregory it has unusual readings.

History 

The manuscript was slightly examined and described by Scholz, Paulin Martin, and C. R. Gregory (1885). According to Scholz, it was formerly indexed in the National Library as Gr. 2247. Isaac Newton cites it by that call number in his discussion of the Johannine Comma.
It was examined by J.G. Reiche.

It was added to the list of New Testament manuscripts by Scholz. Formerly it was labeled by 114a and 134p. In 1908 Gregory gave the number 465 to it.

It is currently housed at the Bibliothèque nationale de France (Gr. 57) in Paris.

See also 

 List of New Testament minuscules
 Biblical manuscript
 Textual criticism

References

Further reading

External links 
 

Greek New Testament minuscules
11th-century biblical manuscripts
Septuagint manuscripts
Bibliothèque nationale de France collections